Itter is a river of Hesse and of North Rhine-Westphalia, Germany. It is a left tributary of the Diemel. It flows through Willingen.

See also
List of rivers of Hesse
List of rivers of North Rhine-Westphalia

References

Rivers of Hesse
Rivers of North Rhine-Westphalia
Rivers of Germany